The Book of Omni is one of the books that make up the Book of Mormon. The book contains only one chapter although it covers more than two centuries of Nephite history (from ca 323 BC to 130 BC, according to footnotes).

Stewardship of the metal plates
Nephi created a book of metal plates for engraving a record. Omni is a descendant of Nephi and he receives the plates through his ancestors. In turn he passes them to his son Amaron.  The plates then pass to Amaron's brother Chemish, then to Chemish's son Abinadom, and finally to Abinadom's son Amaleki. The people of the country, called the Nephites, are in general decline. As each descendant receives the book, they generally write less and less than his predecessor, until the final author, Amaleki. As the last historian of a 400-year civilization, he writes an eloquent, lengthy dirge of his people.

Narrative 
The initial author was Omni, but several others were charged with keeping the record as time passed, though few made significant contributions. Verse 5 explains that "the more wicked part of the Nephites were destroyed." There is little detail about the destruction, except to say that the Lord did visit them in great judgment because of their wickedness.

Abinadom speaks of many wars between the people of Nephi and the Lamanites.

Amaleki speaks of the then current Nephite king, named Mosiah. As had happened previously, the Lord told the king (who appears to be a spiritual leader [prophet] as well as a secular leader) to lead the righteous Nephites out of the land of Nephi, their ancestral home for the previous 400 years, to a new place.  At the end of their journey they discover the Mulekite people whose ancestors had also come from Jerusalem, but after it was attacked by the Babylonians. These people, however, did not bring religious or historical records with them which had two results—they had lost their religion, and they were unable to preserve their language from generation to generation. These people are known as the people of Zarahemla (the name of their then current king and also the name given to the land). Mosiah arranges for the people of Zarahemla to be taught the Nephite language, and Zarahemla is able to recount to him their oral history.

The two groups of people united themselves with Mosiah as their king, and they are all known as Nephites.

The first mention of the Jaredites is found here as well. A large stone is found with writing on it. Mosiah is able to "interpret the engravings by the gift and power of God." It tells of a man named Coriantumr and the downfall of his people. Their history is recounted more fully in the Book of Ether.

Mosiah, the king dies and his son, Benjamin, becomes king. There is a war between the Nephites led by Benjamin and the Lamanites, which by this time is nothing new.

It is apparent that many of the Nephites were reluctant to leave their long-time homeland.  Amaleki describes how some of the Nephites wished to return to the land of Nephi, apparently in an attempt to reclaim it. At the time Amaleki stops writing, he has not received word of them, including his brother who is among them.

Amaleki closes with some words about Christ, asserting that his words are true and that it is his intent to help others come unto Christ. He states at the close of the book that, having no descendants to carry on the record-keeping, he will give the records to King Benjamin.

The Plates
The Book of Omni is the last of the books contained on the Small Plates of Nephi, one of two major divisions of the gold plates.

From First Nephi to the end of Omni, the narratives are first person perspectives (though there are many quotations). The book immediately following Omni, the Words of Mormon, is an editorial insertion that explains why the first person narrative was inserted into the Book of Mormon and how the subsequent narratives differ, being mostly third person narration by Mormon summarizing other lengthier accounts taken from the Large Plates of Nephi. This third person record extends from Mosiah to Fourth Nephi.

References

External links
 The Book of Omni from The official website of The Church of Jesus Christ of Latter-day Saints
 

Omni